Inter Insigniores is a document issued on 15 October 1976 by the Sacred Congregation for the Doctrine of the Faith with the approval of Pope Paul VI. It presents some theological and historical arguments for the Catholic Church's inability to ordain women as priests or bishops. Its title is taken from the opening words of the document's original Latin text, which mean "Among the noteworthy".

References

External links

Ordination of women and the Catholic Church
1976 documents